William Hansson (born 19 June 2001) is a Swedish World Cup alpine ski racer.

He represented Sweden at the FIS Alpine World Ski Championships 2021, and was part of the Swedish team that earned a silver medal in the combined men's and women's team competition.

References

External links

2001 births
Living people
Swedish male alpine skiers